Gaoussou Sackho (born 8 February 1995) is a French professional footballer who plays as a forward for Championnat National 2 club Fréjus Saint-Raphaël.

Personal life 
Born in France, Sackho is of Malian descent. He holds both French and Malian citizenship.

References

1995 births
Living people
Footballers from Caen
Sportspeople from Calvados (department)
French footballers
Malian footballers
French sportspeople of Malian descent
Black French sportspeople
Association football forwards
Stade Malherbe Caen players
US Créteil-Lusitanos players
FC Montceau Bourgogne players
SAS Épinal players
US Lusitanos Saint-Maur players
Andrézieux-Bouthéon FC players
ÉFC Fréjus Saint-Raphaël players
Championnat National 3 players
Ligue 2 players
Championnat National players
Championnat National 2 players
Footballers from Normandy